The athletics competition at the 2009 European Youth Summer Olympic Festival was held from 20 to 24 July. The events took place at the Tampere Stadium in Tampere, Finland. Boys and girls born 1992 or 1993 or later participated 36 track and field events, divided evenly between the sexes.

The event was held shortly after the 2009 World Youth Championships in Athletics. Vera Rudakova (400 m hurdles), Barbara Špiler (hammer throw) and high jumpers Dmitriy Kroyter and Alessia Trost were the four world youth champions to win at this European competition. The most successful athletes of the tournament were Jennie Batten, who did a 100 metres/200 metres double, and Lukas Weisshaidinger, who won both shot put and discus throw events. Sprinter Julien Watrin and middle-distance runner Ioana Doaga each won one gold and one silver, while 3000 metres champion Amela Terzić also made the 1500 metres podium.

Medal summary

Men

Women

References

Results
2009 European Youth Games. World Junior Athletics History. Retrieved on 2014-11-22.

External links
Official website

2009 European Youth Summer Olympic Festival
European Youth Summer Olympic Festival
2009
International athletics competitions hosted by Finland